Jim Scott Burton (October 27, 1949 – December 12, 2013) was a middle relief pitcher who played for the Boston Red Sox in the 1975 and 1977 seasons. He was born in Royal Oak, Michigan.

The Red Sox drafted Burton out of the University of Michigan in the first round (5th pick) of the 1971 draft. He was 25 years old when he made his major league debut on June 10, 1975. His uniform number was 43.

Professional career
Burton is best known as the losing pitcher of Game 7 of the 1975 World Series. After Red Sox manager Darrell Johnson pinch hit for closer Jim Willoughby in the bottom of the eighth inning, Burton was sent to the mound for the top of the ninth inning to face the Cincinnati Reds in a 3–3 tied game. In two-thirds of an inning, he walked two batters and surrendered the game-winning hit to the Reds' Joe Morgan.

Burton made his last pitching appearance on September 17, 1977. Then, on March 29, 1978, he was traded by the Red Sox to the New York Mets in exchange for utility infielder Leo Foster.

In a two-season career, Burton posted a 1–2 record with a 2.75 ERA and one save in 30 games pitched. He played 29 games in the 1975 season, with 53 innings pitched and a 2.89 ERA, but only pitched 2.2 innings in a 1977 game.  His one save came on September 13, 1975, in the second game of a Red Sox doubleheader against the Brewers. Burton pitched 1 2/3 scoreless innings to nail down the 6–3 victory over the Brewers. Burton saved the game for starting pitcher Reggie Cleveland.

Death
Burton died in December 2013 in Charlotte, North Carolina, at the age of 64.

References

External links
, or Retrosheet
SABR BioProject – Jim Burton biography by Les Masterson

1949 births
2013 deaths
Baseball players from Michigan
Boston Red Sox players
Bristol Red Sox players
Louisville Colonels (minor league) players
Lynchburg Mets players
Major League Baseball pitchers
Michigan Wolverines baseball players
Pawtucket Red Sox players
Baseball players from Charlotte, North Carolina
Sportspeople from Royal Oak, Michigan
Tidewater Tides players